Calodesma amica is a moth of the family Erebidae. It was described by Stoll in 1781. It is found in Suriname and Ecuador.

Subspecies
Calodesma amica amica (Surinam)
Calodesma amica occidentalis Hering, 1925 (Ecuador)

References

Calodesma
Moths described in 1781